The Kashechewan First Nation is a Cree First Nation band government located near James Bay in Northern Ontario, Canada.   The community is located on the northern shore of the Albany River.  Kashechewan First Nation is one of two communities that were established from Old Fort Albany (now the Fort Albany 67 Indian Reserve) in the 1950s.  The other community is Fort Albany First Nation, which is now located on the southern bank of the Albany River. The community is connected to other towns along the shore of James Bay by the seasonal ice road/winter road, linking it to the towns of Attawapiskat, Fort Albany, and Moosonee.

Kashechewan is policed by the Nishnawbe-Aski Police Service, an Aboriginal-based service. A fire at the detachment on January 9, 2006, severely injured an officer and killed two inmates as they could not be rescued.

When the community of Kashechewan came into being, the new residents chose the name "Keeshechewan".  (This has the meaning, in Cree, of "where the water flows fast".)  However, when the sign for the new post office arrived, it had the misspelling "Kashechewan", and this became the official name of the community. This official name has no real meaning in the Cree language.

Politics  
Kashechewan First Nation is a member community of the Mushkegowuk Council, along with seven other First Nations in Northern Ontario.  The community and Mushkegowuk Council are represented by the Nishnawbe Aski Nation (NAN). NAN is a political territorial organization that represents the 49 First Nations that are part of the Treaty No. 9 area in Northern Ontario.  At the provincial level, the community, tribal council and political territorial organization participate in a province-wide coordinating body, the Chiefs of Ontario.  The Assembly of First Nations represents the community along with other First Nations organizations and councils, as well as over 600 First Nations across Canada.

As of 2018, the elected leaders of the First Nation include Chief Leo Friday Sr and Deputy Chief Hosea Wesley.  The community's leadership consists of a chief, a deputy chief and 9 Councillors. Local elections are held every three years, last in August 2018.

The community also has a Youth Council consisting of 11 members with 5 key positions (Youth chief. Youth Deputy Chief, Youth Head Councillor, Treasurer and Secretary.

Services

St. Andrew's Elementary School and Francine J. Wesley Secondary School are the schools located within Kashechewan. These services provide the basic education for the students of the community. The schools also have a council system, which has 14 members as of January 2016.

Kashechewan Health Services provides services that promote physical and mental health for community members. They provide health education regarding diabetes, cancer, and other serious ailments 
They also offer programs that help with addiction, pregnancy, parenting, drug awareness, and crisis intervention.

Kashechewan Nursing Station provides basic health care needs in the community. It is federally run by Health Canada's First Nation and Inuit Branch and partnered with Weeneebayko Area Health Authority.

Northern Store is the only retail store offering food and other consumer goods in town. The store is the largest building in town. Northern Store also has a location in Fort Albany to the south; without it foods need to be flown in by air. A helipad next to the store is used by Ornge for medical transfers out of Kashechewan from the Kashechewan Nursing Station is operated by Health Canada but is assisted by the provincially run Weeneebayko Area Health Authority. The store recently got a remodeling, and a Tim Hortons.

There is a hockey arena, Kashechewan Community Arena, that serves as the recreation centre for residents. There is a sports field outside of the new Anglican church that can support baseball, football and soccer during the summer months. Inside the arena is a community arena pad and rink.

St Paul's Anglican Church is the only religious centre in town and attached to the Anglican Diocese of Moosonee.

Roads in town do not connect beyond Kashechewan. There are winter roads created to provide contractor access to town. Besides cars, skidoos provide means to travel in town.

Kashechewan Airport and travel by boat are the only means to travel outside of Kashechewan. Riverside Drive is the main road running along the shores of the Albany River. There are smaller side streets:

 Wa We Yas Ton Crescent

Homes are mainly single-floor fabricated houses or trailer homes.

A water treatment plant is found along the Mekopaymuko Channel near the Albany River. A dike along the north shore of the Albany River provides limited flood control; hence Kashechewan is prone to flooding.

Feasibility studies were undertaken in 2017 as to the construction of a permanent all-season road to the communities of Kashechewan, Fort Albany, Moosonee and Attawapiskat. The project, if undertaken, will entail a "coastal road" connecting the four communities with each other, as well as a road to link the coastal road to the provincial highway system at Fraserdale, Kapuskasing or Hearst.

In January 2021, the 311-kilometre James Bay Winter Ice Road was under construction, to connect Attawapiskat, Kashechewan, Fort Albany and Moosonee. It opened some time in winter 2021 and was said to accept loads up to 50,000 kilograms in weight. The road was operated by Kimesskanemenow LP, "a limited partnership between the four communities it connects".

Water-quality crisis 
In late October and early November 2005, over 800 members of the First Nation were evacuated after E. coli bacteria were discovered in their water supply system.  The First Nation had been under a boil-water advisory for two years. The drinking water was supplied by a relatively new treatment plant built in March 1998. The cause of the tainted water was found to be a plugged chlorine injector which was not discovered by local operators who had not been adequately trained to run the treatment plant. When officials arrived and fixed the problem, chlorine levels were around 1.7 mg/L.

In 2001, the Ontario Clean Water Agency conducted a survey, funded by the federal ministry of Indian and Northern Affairs and the Ontario First Nations Technical Services Corporation, of water systems on Indian reserves in the province. The survey identified 62 communities in the province, including Kashechewan, where severe problems affected the communities' water systems. These problems included broken treatment plant equipment, malfunctioning safety alarms, funding shortages, water sampling deficiencies and a shortage of trained water treatment plant staff. To date, little if any action has been taken on the report's recommendations.

In 2003, a report by the same agency described the situation in Kashechewan as "a Walkerton-in-waiting". Several politicians subsequently visited the First Nation, including its Member of Provincial Parliament Gilles Bisson and Member of Parliament Charlie Angus, Ontario Minister of Community Safety Monte Kwinter in April 2005 and federal New Democratic Party leader Jack Layton in the summer of 2005.

As the water quality situation progressed, Indian and Northern Affairs began to fly bottled water in to the First Nation.  From April 2005 to mid-October 2005, this cost roughly $250,000 CAD.

Discovery of E. coli 
E. coli was discovered in the water of the First Nation as early as October 18, 2005, sparking widespread coverage by the media in Canada of the situation. The news of contaminated water was first published by the Timmins Daily Press. Following this, the first announcement regarding possible evacuation of the community came from the federal Ministry of Indian and Northern Affairs, who announced on October 24 that after evaluating the situation, the community would not be evacuated.

The next day, October 25, the Government of Ontario announced that it would evacuate all people of Kashechewan requiring medical attention.  This was estimated to be roughly 60% of the community's 1,900 members, who would travel to Timmins, Cochrane, Sudbury, Sault Ste. Marie, Capreol and other Northern Ontario communities for medical aid. Some of these evacuees included children diagnosed with scabies and impetigo.

On October 25, the federal government confirmed that "water samples taken between October 17, 2005, and October 19, 2005, indicated no E. coli or coliform bacteria present in the community’s water supply." On October 27, the government confirmed that it would invest money in relocating the community to higher and safer ground in the area, including the construction of a water treatment plant. On October 30, a temporary portable water filtration system, capable of producing 50,000 litres per day of clean, drinkable water through reverse osmosis, was transported to the community.

On November 5, the federal government published its findings. According to the report, "recent test results of water samples show no E. coli, no total coliform bacteria and maximum chlorine levels that fall within provincial standards. This means the plant is producing safe water."

Phil Fontaine, chief of the Assembly of First Nations, has stated that over 100 aboriginal communities in Canada are currently living under permanent long-term boil-water advisories.

Skin conditions

The reserve's water was blamed by community members for chronic skin conditions, which gained public prominence in 2016 after MP Charlie Angus shared pictures of children with skin lesions on his Twitter account. Doctors flown into the community by Health Canada found 26 people, mostly children, with skin conditions; the patients were diagnosed variously with scabies, mild impetigo and, most commonly, eczema. The skin conditions were described as "not a medical emergency," though elevated chlorine levels may cause skin dryness that contributes to itching, and in the case of eczema, very hot water and dryness can worsen the condition.

Flooding

The community has suffered regularly since 2006 from flooding and water contamination when ice melts on the Albany River. Members of the community were evacuated for six consecutive years between 2012 and 2019.

Suicide crisis

In January 2007, 21 young people in Kashechewan — including one nine-year-old — attempted to commit suicide. On February 7, MP Charlie Angus (NDP—Timmins-James Bay) spoke in the Canadian House of Commons about the crisis, calling on the government to deal with the crisis and to increase education funding to help improve special education and crisis counselling services in First Nations' schools.

Studies have estimated that the suicide rate among Canadian First Nations is five to six times higher than among non-aboriginal Canadians.

Proposed move
On November 9, 2006, a report by a former Member of Provincial Parliament, Alan Pope, recommended a number of possible solutions to the ongoing Kashechewan crisis, including upgrading the current site, moving the community to a new site, and moving the residents to the existing communities of Fort Albany, Smooth Rock Falls or Timmins. Pope, a resident of Timmins, recommended the Timmins option.

On July 30, 2007, the government of Canada signed a memorandum of agreement and understanding with the community,  giving the Kashechewan First Nation reserve a grant of $200 million to improve and repair infrastructure, housing and flood-control services in the existing community.

On March 31, 2017, the government of Canada, the government of Ontario and Kashechewan First Nation signed a framework agreement for relocation of the First Nation Community to move them up river. The majority of the community had voted prior to proposing of the framework. It was and is an important issue regarding the safety and quality of life for the betterment of the community. Notable names on the signing event: Chief Leo Friday, Deputy Chief Hosea Wesley, Mushkegowuk Grand Chief Jonathan Solomon, Deputy Grand Chief Rebecca Friday, Nishnawbe Aski Nation Grand Chief Alvin Fiddler, Deputy Grand Chief Anna Achneepineskum, Deputy Grand Chief Jason Smallboy, Ontario Regional Chief Isadore Day, the honourable INAC Minister Carolyn Bennett, the honourable legislative Assembly of Ontario David Zimmer and the Community members of Kashechewan First Nation.

References

External links
 Kashechewan First Nation

First Nations governments in Ontario
Health disasters in Canada
Cree reserves in Ontario
Communities in Kenora District
Nishnawbe Aski Nation
Swampy Cree
Road-inaccessible communities of Ontario